Kregor is a male given name. Notable people with the name include:

Kregor Hermet (born 1997), Estonian basketball player
Kregor Zirk (born 1999), Estonian swimmer

See also
Gregor

Masculine given names